Mikołaj Krzysztof Radziwiłł (4 February 1515 – 28 May 1565),  nicknamed The Black (Polish: Czarny), was a Polish-Lithuanian noble who held several administrative positions within the Grand Duchy of Lithuania: Voivode of Vilnius, Grand Lithuanian Chancellor, and Grand Hetman of Lithuania.

His first name is sometimes given in English as Nicholas.

Political influence

Mikołaj was able to gain much political influence thanks to the romance between his cousin Barbara Radziwiłł and the King of Poland and Grand Duke of Lithuania Zygmunt II August. This made him one of the most powerful royal advisers. Mikolaj became Marshal of Lithuania, Grand Chancellor of Lithuania, as well as Palatine of Vilnius, gained immense wealth and became the most powerful magnate in the Commonwealth of that time.

The growing influence of the Radziwiłł family was further bolstered when, during a diplomatic mission to Charles V and Ferdinand I, he and his cousin Mikołaj the Red received a hereditary title of Prince (Reichsfürst (SRI)).

He formed an alliance with his cousin Mikołaj "the Red" Radziwiłł against other notable Lithuanian families in the rivalry for the dominant status in the Great Duchy of Lithuania. This alliance marked the formation of a dynastic-like cooperation between Radziwiłłs and showed how family interests could affect magnates' relations with the state. Both Radziwiłłs backed the cause of Lithuania's sovereignty and opposed the growing Polish-Lithuanian union.

Coincidentally, despite opposing close ties with Poland, he was the chief negotiator in the successful negotiation between the Grand Duchy of Lithuania and the state controlled by the Livonian Order, which led to the secularisation of Livonia and its union with the Grand Duchy of Lithuania in 1562.

Mikołaj contributed to the ongoing Polonisation of the Grand Duchy, influencing other Lithuanian nobles to follow him in adopting Polish cultureits fashion, customs and language. Despite being a fervent opponent of the closer union with Poland, he was an active supporter of Polish culture in Lithuania. He himself did not speak Lithuanian, his knowledge of Ruthenian, at that time the official language of the Grand Duchy, was limited. Polish was his native language and the only one he was able to use fluently.

Religious activities

He was known for his religious beliefs, as he was one of the most prominent converts and advocates of the Reformed churches faith in Grand Duchy of Lithuania. He provided financial support for the printing of the first complete Polish translation of the Bible in 1563 in Brest-Litovsk, distributed works written in defense of the Reformed faith, financed a church and college in Vilnius, supported educated Protestants, and in various other ways fostered the Calvinist faith. He is known to have exchanged letters with John Calvin and protected religious exiles from Italy. Because Protestants supported usage of local languages, he is also believed to have funded Lithuanian churches and schools.

Legacy
With the exception of his daughter Anna, all his children converted to Roman Catholicism and became ardent supporters of the Counter Reformation.

He is remembered by a statue in the Brest Millennium Monument.

Gallery

Citations and references

Cited sources
 Józef Jasnowski, Mikołaj Czarny Radziwiłł (1515-1565). Kanclerz i marszałek ziemski Wielkiego Księstwa Litewskiego, wojewoda wileński, Oświęcim 2014.

1515 births
1565 deaths
Converts to Calvinism
People from Nesvizh
Polish Calvinist and Reformed Christians
Lithuanian Calvinist and Reformed Christians
Mikolaj the Black Radziwill
Grand Chancellors of the Grand Duchy of Lithuania
Deputy Chancellors of the Grand Duchy of Lithuania
Grand Marshals of the Grand Duchy of Lithuania
Voivode of Vilnius